Gerardo Reyes may refer to:

Gerardo Reyes (actor) (1935–2015), Mexican actor
Gerardo Reyes (journalist) (born 1958), Colombian journalist
Gerardo Reyes (baseball) (born 1993), Mexican baseball player
Gerardo Reyes (footballer) (born 1998), Spanish footballer

See also
Geraldo Reyes, American politician